Louis-Pierre "Pierrot" Cazal (1906–1945) was a French international footballer. Cazal spent most of his career with Sète winning the Coupe de France in 1930 with the club. With the France national team, Cazal played in six matches.

References 

1901 births
1945 deaths
French footballers
France international footballers
FC Sète 34 players
French football managers
FC Sète 34 managers
Association football midfielders
Sportspeople from Aude
Footballers from Occitania (administrative region)
FC Nancy players
Toulouse FC (1937) players
FC Antibes players
AS Monaco FC players